Didem Balçın (born 18 May 1982) is a Turkish actress. She is famous for her role as 'Selcan Hatun' in the TV series, Diriliş: Ertuğrul and Kuruluş: Osman.

Life and career 
Didem Balçın was born on 18 May 1982 in Ankara. Her father worked for TRT Radio and her mother Nur Balçın represented Turkey at a beauty pageant in Japan in 1975, Her maternal family is of Turkish and Albanian origins. She graduated from Ankara University School of Literature, History and Geography with a degree in theatre studies. After graduation she moved to Istanbul and appeared in various commercials and TV series. Her first professional appearance on stage was at Levent Kırca Theatre with a role in the play Ateşin Düştüğü Yer. In 2009, she founded her own theatre company with Nergis Öztürk. For her role in the comedy movie Bunu Yapan İki Kişi, she won the Li̇ons Award for Best Comedy Actress. After continuing her career on stage, in 2011 she founded the "Doda Sanat" Education Consultancy with her sister. She is notable for her role as Selcan Hatun in the series Diriliş: Ertuğrul and Kuruluş: Osman.

In 2021, Pakistani designer Maria B also signed her as a model for her winter collection.

Personal life
Didem Balçın and Turkish actor Can Aydın were engaged in March 2020. The couple got married in May 2020. Their first child, a son name Alican, was born in April 2021.

Filmography

References

External links 
 
 

Living people
1982 births
Actresses from Ankara
Turkish television actresses
Turkish film actresses